The 1982 Men's Hockey World Cup was the fifth edition of the Hockey World Cup, the quadrennial world championship for men's national field hockey teams organized by the FIH. The event took place from 29 December 1981 to 12 January 1982 in Mumbai (Bombay), India.

12 teams competed in it and Pakistan won the tournament for the third time by defeating West Germany 3–1 in the final.

Pools
Pools for the 1982 Men's Hockey World Cup as announced by the International Hockey Federation (FIH) were:

Results
All times are Indian Standard Time (UTC+05:30).

Preliminary round

Pool A

Pool B

Ninth to twelfth place classification

Cross-overs

Eleventh and twelfth place

Ninth and tenth place

Fifth to eighth place classification

Cross-overs

Seventh and eighth place

Fifth and sixth place

First to fourth place classification

Semi-finals

Third and fourth place

Final

Final standings

References

Men's Hockey World Cup
Sports competitions in Mumbai
Hockey World Cup Men
World Cup
International field hockey competitions hosted by India
Hockey World Cup Men
Hockey World Cup Men
1980s in Mumbai